The 1929 Indiana Hoosiers football team represented the Indiana Hoosiers in the 1929 college football season as members of the Big Ten Conference. The Hoosiers played their home games at Memorial Stadium in Bloomington, Indiana. The team was coached by Harlan Page, in his fourth year as head coach.  The 1929 Hoosiers compiled  2–6–1 record and finished in a tie for seventh place in the Big Ten.

Schedule

References

Indiana
Indiana Hoosiers football seasons
Indiana Hoosiers football